Chioninia spinalis is a species of skink in the family Scincidae. It is endemic to the Cape Verde Islands, and has been found on the islands of Sal, Boa Vista, Maio, Santiago, Fogo and several smaller islets.

Subspecies
There are five subspecies:
 Chioninia spinalis boavistensis Miralles, Vasconcelos, Perera, Harris & Carranza, 2010
 Chioninia spinalis maioensis (Mertens, 1955)
 Chioninia spinalis salensis (Angel, 1935)
 Chioninia spinalis santiagoensis Miralles, Vasconcelos, Perera, Harris & Carranza, 2010
 Chioninia spinalis spinalis (Boulenger, 1906)

Publications
 Angel, 1935 : Lézards des Îles du Cap Vert, rapportés par M. le Professeur Chevalier. Description de espèces nouvelles (Lizards of the Cape Verde Islands). Bulletin by the Museum of Natural History, Paris, series 2, vol. VII p. 165-169
 Boulenger, 1906 : Report on the reptiles collected by the late L. Fea in West Africa. Annali di Museo Civico di Storia Naturale di Genova (Annals of the Genoa Civic Museum of Natural History), series 3, vol. II, p. 196-216
 Mertens, 1955 : Die Eidechsen der Kapverden. Commentationes biologicae, vol. 15, no. 15, p. 1-16

References

spinalis
Endemic vertebrates of Cape Verde
Reptiles described in 1906
Taxa named by George Albert Boulenger
Fauna of Boa Vista, Cape Verde
Fauna of Maio, Cape Verde
Fauna of Sal, Cape Verde
Fauna of Santiago, Cape Verde